The Pittsburgh Pro Football Hall of Fame (PPFHOF) is a nonprofit organization established in 2010.  The PPFHOF is dedicated to honoring the greatest players, coaches and staff members in Pittsburgh professional football history.  It was founded in 2010 and inducted its first hall of fame class in 2011. The electorate is a broad cross section of former Pittsburgh Steelers (including players Dermontti Dawson, Levon Kirkland, Andy Russell, Chad Brown, Ernie Mills, Roy Jefferson, Lee Flowers, Leon Searcy, Reggie Harrison, and radio announcer Bill Hillgrove among others) and researchers specializing in Steelers history. The PPFHOF is the only hall of fame specifically dedicated to football in the city of Pittsburgh and inducts athletes, coaches, and administrators, based on football achievements, off-field citizenship and other intangibles that made him/her valuable to the organization and/or community.  Nominees from Pittsburgh teams in other professional leagues, including the USFL, Arena League, or any defunct or future leagues are also considered.  The PPFHOF Steering Committee is engaged in ongoing discussions regarding the possible inclusion of college players and players from organized amateur leagues and the feasibility of establishing a brick-and-mortar hall of fame in Pittsburgh.

Voting procedures
Each year, the PPFHOF board selects approximately twenty candidates to appear on the annual ballot. Electors will vote for a maximum of four players and a maximum of three coaches, scouts or staffers. There is no minimum number of votes a candidate must receive to remain on the ballot in subsequent years.  Final results are announced each year in March.

Criteria
A player becomes eligible for consideration immediately following his retirement or departure from the Steelers with no mandatory waiting period.  Coaches and staff members become eligible after retirement or after 15 years of cumulative service. Each nominee is graded on football achievements, off-field citizenship and other intangibles that made him/her valuable to the organization and/or community.

Inductees
There have been five induction classes since the hall's inception, beginning in 2011 and continuing through 2015.

2011 Inaugural Class:
Players
Joe Greene*
Jack Lambert*
Mel Blount*
Franco Harris*
Rod Woodson*
Jack Ham*
Mike Webster*
Dermontti Dawson*
Terry Bradshaw*
Ernie Stautner*
Coaches
Chuck Noll*
Bill Cowher*
Administrators
Art Rooney, Sr.*
Dan Rooney*
Scouts
Bill Nunn*
Dick Haley

2012 Class:
Players
Hines Ward
Jerome Bettis*
Alan Faneca*
John Stallworth*
Coach
John Mitchell
Administrator
Joe Carr
Scout
Phil Kreidler

2013 Class:
Players
Andy Russell
L. C. Greenwood
Casey Hampton
Donnie Shell*
Coach
Dick LeBeau*
Administrator
James Boston
Scout
Bob Schmitz

2014 Class:
Players
Lynn Swann*
Carnell Lake
Greg Lloyd
Jack Butler*
Coach
Dick Hoak
Administrator
Mary Regan
Scout
Tom Modrak

2015 Class:
Players
Rocky Bleier
John Henry Johnson*
Bobby Layne*
Mike Wagner
Pioneers
John Brallier
Pudge Heffelfinger
Ray Kemp
Contributor
Myron Cope
President's Award
Henry Ford

* = Also a member of the Professional Football Hall of Fame

See also
Sports in Pennsylvania

References

External links
PPFHOF official website
PPFHOF official Facebook page

>
American football in Pittsburgh
American football museums and halls of fame
Halls of fame in Pennsylvania
Non-profit organizations based in Pennsylvania
Awards established in 2010
Sports organizations established in 2010
2010 establishments in Pennsylvania